Howmeh Rural District is in the Central District of Ben County, Chaharmahal and Bakhtiari province, Iran. At the censuses of 2006 and 2011, its constituent parts were within the former Ben District of Shahrekord County and before the establishment of Ben County. At the most recent census of 2016, the population of the rural district was 3,194 in 1,019 households. The largest of its two villages was Sheykh Shaban, with 2,683 people.

References 

Ben County

Rural Districts of Chaharmahal and Bakhtiari Province

Populated places in Chaharmahal and Bakhtiari Province

Populated places in Ben County

fa:دهستان حومه (بن)